The Shining (stylized as Stephen King's The Shining) is a 1997 three-episode horror television miniseries based on the 1977 Stephen King novel of the same name. Directed by Mick Garris from King's teleplay, it is the second adaptation of King's book after the 1980 film by Stanley Kubrick and was written and produced by King based on his dissatisfaction with Kubrick's version. The miniseries was shot at The Stanley Hotel in Estes Park, Colorado, King's inspiration for the novel, in March 1996.

The 1997 adaptation stars Steven Weber as Jack Torrance; Rebecca De Mornay as Jack's wife Wendy; Courtland Mead and Wil Horneff as different-aged versions of Danny Torrance; and Melvin Van Peebles as Dick Hallorann. Pat Hingle, Elliott Gould, John Durbin, Stanley Anderson, Lisa Thornhill, and Garris' wife Cynthia appear in supporting roles. Several notable writers and filmmakers working in the horror genre cameo in the miniseries' ballroom scene, and King himself appears as an orchestra conductor.

Originally airing from April 27 to May 1, 1997 on the American television network ABC, The Shining enjoyed a favorable reception when it first aired. It was a ratings hit, being in the top 20 of daily viewership numbers for all three episodes; acclaimed by critics for its careful pacing, makeup, depth, sound editing and creepy atmosphere; and won two Primetime Emmy and two Saturn Awards. However, retrospective critics have viewed the miniseries less fondly, comparing it unfavorably to Kubrick's film version.

Plot
Jack Torrance's alcoholism and explosive temper have cost him his teaching job at Stovington, a respectable prep school. He is also on the verge of losing his family, after assaulting his young son Danny in a drunken rage just a year earlier. Horrified by what he has become, Jack tells his wife Wendy that should he ever start drinking again, he will leave them one way or another, implying that he would rather commit suicide than continue living as an alcoholic.

Now, nursing a life of sobriety and pulling in work as a writer, Jack takes on the job of looking after the Overlook Hotel, a large colonial building in a picturesque valley in the Colorado Rockies. Jack believes that the job will provide desperately needed funds and give him the time to complete his first play.

Upon entering the Overlook and meeting its head cook, Dick Hallorann, Danny discovers that his psychic powers grant him a form of telepathy. Danny has an adult mentor named Tony who talks to him in his visions and shows him the future. Hallorann tells Danny that he too "shines", and that Danny can contact him telepathically anytime he needs assistance. The Torrances are given a tour of the Overlook before being left alone in the hotel for the winter.

It gradually becomes evident that there is a malevolent force within the hotel that seems determined to use Danny for an unknown, possibly sinister purpose. This force manifests itself with flickering lamps and spectral voices and eventually a full-on masked ball from the Overlook's past. Danny is the first to fully notice the darker character of the hotel, having experienced visions and warnings that foreshadow what he and his parents will encounter over the winter.

The ghosts also appear to Jack, led by Delbert Grady, the Overlook's former steward who murdered his entire family and killed himself at the hotel's command. Grady and the other spirits tell Jack that Wendy and Danny are turning against him, and that his only option is to kill them. They also supply him with an open bar, and he begins drinking again. As Jack's sanity deteriorates, Wendy begins to fear for her and Danny's safety.

Hallorann, whom Danny had contacted telepathically, travels from Florida to Colorado, only to be assaulted by Jack with a croquet mallet and left for dead. Danny telepathically communicates with his father, who momentarily breaks free of the ghosts' grip, and then tells him that the old boiler has been neglected. Danny, Wendy, and Hallorann (who had only been stunned by the attack) escape to safety. Jack sacrifices himself to prevent the ghosts from repossessing him and allows the boiler to explode and destroy the Overlook.

Ten years later, Danny graduates from high school, showing that Tony was Danny's adult incarnate self. Wendy and Halloran are present at the ceremony. Jack's spirit is also present, looking on Danny with pride. Back in Colorado, the Overlook is being rebuilt as a resort for the summer, as the ghosts of the original hotel await potential victims.

Cast
 Steven Weber as Jack Torrance
 Rebecca De Mornay as Wendy Torrance
 Courtland Mead as Danny Torrance
 Wil Horneff as Tony; Danny adult
 Melvin Van Peebles as Dick Hallorann
 Pat Hingle as Pete Watson
 Elliott Gould as Stuart Ullman
 John Durbin as Horace Derwent
 Stanley Anderson as Delbert Grady
 Cynthia Garris as Lorraine Massey (Woman in Room 217)
 Lisa Thornhill as Rita Hayworth Look-alike
 Miguel Ferrer as Mark James Torrance
 Michael O'Neill as Doctor Daniel Edwards
 Jan Van Sickle as Al Shockley

Several of Garris' colleagues who work in the horror genre cameo in the miniseries' ballroom scene, such as David J. Schow, Christa Faust, P. G. Sturges, Richard Christian Matheson, and Frank Darabont. Stephen King appears as Gage Creed, the orchestra conductor, and Shawnee Smith cameos as a waitress. Sam Raimi also briefly appears as a gas station attendant.

Production

Development
The creation of this miniseries is attributed to Stephen King's dissatisfaction with director Stanley Kubrick's 1980 film of the same name. In order to receive Kubrick's approval to re-adapt The Shining into a program closer to the original story, King had to agree in writing to eschew his frequent public criticism of Kubrick's film, save for the sole commentary that he was disappointed with Jack Nicholson's portrayal of Jack Torrance as though he had been insane before his arrival at the Overlook Hotel. ABC's success with previous miniseries adaptations of King's work made them more than willing to offer the author to work on the screenplay for The Shining miniseries with small Broadcast Standards and Practices enforced.

The casting team had a very difficult time finding an actor for the role of Jack Torrance as most of the considerations who rejected the role worried about being compared to Nicholson's performance in the Kubrick version. Two of the many actors considered included Tim Daly (who had starred with Weber on the TV series Wings) and Gary Sinise. King got very impatient, threatening to "wait another 18 years" if the role for Jack Torrance wasn't booked. Finally, via a suggestion from Rebecca De Mornay, Weber was chosen for the role four days before filming began. Weber accepted the offer because he was a fan of the Mick Garris-directed miniseries for The Stand and found the script he read to be "multi-layered" and relatable. King was the one who chose De Mornay for the role of Wendy. The producers approached her in 1994, and she accepted the role, enjoying the script for being "creepier, more disturbing, and more entertaining," and closer to the novel than the Kubrick version.

Filming

Aside from the motive behind the creation of the miniseries, the 1997 rendition featured an important set piece that helped to inspire the original story: The Stanley Hotel in Estes Park, Colorado. King used the hotel that inspired him to write the book as the miniseries' location, with some interior shots in stages also in Denver. Garris tried to make the hotel feel as "enclosed" as possible to add a vibe of claustrophobia when in a closed hotel; the crew did this by emphasizing the "darkness" of the hotel, painting some of Stanley's areas that had recently been painted white, brown.

The production team began shooting at the Stanley Hotel in March 1996, the date chosen as it was Denver's snowiest month. However, on the day filming began, they realized the hotel as well as most of Estes Park was in a "snow shadow," meaning it garnered the least amount of snow out of all Denver areas. As a result, they spent $100,000 in snowmaking machines sent from Los Angeles while lucking out on "three or four" shooting days with actual snow falling on Estes. Producer Mark Carliner attributed the lucky snowfalls to a Ute shaman doing a ritual at the highest peak of the Rocky Mountains. The cast and crew, such as Cynthia Garris, Mick Garris' wife who plays the woman in Room 217; and Dawn Jeffrey-Nelson, Courtland Mead's acting coach claimed paranormal experiences occurring at the hotel during shooting.

Some of the cast enjoyed working on The Shining. Mead "wasn't scared" as he had acted previously in horror films like Hellraiser: Bloodline (1996); John Durbin enjoyed the "madness" he got to portray with his character of Horace Derwent; and Stanley Anderson, who accepted the part of Delbert Grady based on his disappointment with the Kubrick version, tried to play the character "real" but with "a sense of distance to [his] view of the other and the world, so it comes out as irony or wryness." However, it was tough for Weber to play his character; because the scenes were not shot in chronological order, it was very difficult to master the character's mental state deterioration, due to it occurring gradually as the story progresses.

Effects

Steve Johnson and his XFX team were responsible for the effects of The Shining. When it came to the moving topiary animals, both live static and computer-animated versions of them were made. For the more-than-80 dead extra characters in the ballroom, Bill Corso came up with the idea to add black marks on their cheeks and foreheads to make them look dead. A special-effects-predominant ballroom sequence wasn't in the final version, where Gage Creed and his orchestra "run like tallow," in King's words. Garris' reason was that it slowed down the miniseries' pacing and wasn't as "close[] to the real world" as the other scenes. For the makeup of the woman in Room 217, thin shells of Saran Wrap were first glued on to certain areas of the actress' body via K-Y jelly. Then, "some really milky-looking flesh tones" were added over the wrap and purple tones under it, before thin latex was covered over the entire body with certain areas ripped off. Foam latex was also used to slightly alleviate how "creepy" the woman's make-up looked. As Johnson explained what the effects team were going for with the dead lady, "the idea was to try to do something that was different, that would look cool, play in the scene and be allowed on TV."

Reception
The first part of The Shining garnered 19.8 million viewers, ranking #12 for the week with a household rating of 12.5 and a market share of 19. The second part also ranked #12 for the week, with 18.3 million viewers, a 12.1 rating and a 20 share. The third part ranked #14 for the week, with 18.2 million viewers, an 11.9 rating and a 16 share.

The Shining opened to overwhelming praise from critics when it aired in 1997, which included a ten-out-of-ten review from TV Guide. The miniseries' "carefully" and "masterfully crafted" pacing was highlighted by several reviewers, including Ray Richmond of Variety, who also noted its "edge-of-your-seat creepiness" and "surprising emotional complexity and depth." The depth and creepiness was also praised by Ken Tucker of Entertainment Weekly. However, Tom Shales of The Washington Post advised his readers to "avoid [the miniseries] like the plague, because it is the plague."

In more recent years, the miniseries critical reputation has cooled considerably with most finding it inferior compared to Kubrick's adaptation. The review aggregator website Rotten Tomatoes reported that 36% of critics have given the miniseries a positive review based on 11 reviews, with an average rating of 6.0/10. The site's critics consensus reads, "Stephen King's televisual adaption of his own novel is more faithful than its cinematic counterpart, but unfortunately this miniseries is hobbled by a drab literalism of the text and cheesy effects that diminish the scares." Drew Grant of The New York Observer, in 2014, ranked the miniseries as the worst made-for-TV King adaptation.

Accolades
The Shining won two Primetime Emmy Awards for Outstanding Makeup and Outstanding Sound Editing for a Miniseries or a Special. It was also nominated for Outstanding Miniseries but lost to Prime Suspect 5: Errors of Judgement in the category. It also won two Saturn Awards for Best Single Genre Television Presentation and Best Genre TV Actor (Steven Weber). Courtland Mead was nominated for a Young Artist Award for Best Performance in a TV Movie / Pilot / Mini-Series: Young Actor Age 10 or Under.

See also

 List of ghost films

References

Works cited

External links
 
 Movie Junk Archive—Stephen King's The Shining
 The Stanley Hotel Official website

1997 television films
1997 films
1990s American television miniseries
1990s psychological horror films
Films based on American horror novels
Films based on works by Stephen King
Television shows written by Stephen King
Alcohol abuse in television
American Broadcasting Company original programming
American haunted house films
Domestic violence in television
Films set in hotels
Films about alcoholism
Films about domestic violence
Films set in Colorado
Films shot in Colorado
Films directed by Mick Garris
Films about writers
Ghosts in television
Haunted hotels
American horror television films
Saturn Award-winning television series
The Shining (franchise)
Television shows based on works by Stephen King
Films with screenplays by Stephen King
1990s American films